The Centre for Research into Earth Energy Systems is a Geo-Energy research centre at Durham University. The centre was formed in January 2006, and since then has won a research income of £1.3M per annum. The current Director of CeREES is Professor Jon Gluyas, co-author of textbook Petroleum Geoscience. The Centre is part of the multidisciplinary Durham Energy Institute. CeREES is one of only three academic members of the Carbon Capture and Storage Association and is also a member of the Underground Coal Gasification Association.

Research

CeREES began as a Petroleum Geoscience research centre, but has now expanded into all areas of Geo-Energy. The areas of research are:

Petroleum Exploration and Production

CeREES works with energy companies to carry out research in different areas of petroleum geoscience. These areas include:
Volcanic Rifted Margins 
Source Rocks
Overpressure
Sedimentary and structural geology of passive margins

Geothermal

CeREES research in geothermal is related to micro seismicity linked with volcanically active regions, numerical modelling of hydro-mechanical effects   and the exploitation of geothermal energy from low to medium grade geothermal aquifers.

Carbon Capture and Storage

Carbon Capture and Storage (CCS) is an important component of many initiatives to reduce global greenhouse gas emissions. CEREES recently appointed the first ever UK Professor of CCS. CeREES interests are specifically associated with the development and application of risking and screening tools.  CeREES is involved in various CCS research projects, including the ETI sponsored UKSAP (UK Storage Appraisal Project).

Clean Coal

CeREES is involved in research into cleaner ways of using coal as a fossil fuel. Research projects on underground coal gasification, coal bed methane and enhanced coal bed methane are underway.

Geo-Energy Scholarship Programme

Students in the CeREES Geo-Energy Scholarship Programme are offered training in the energy industry through monthly short courses with industry professionals, as well as undertaking a PhD in a Geo-Energy topic. PhD studentships are funded by over 15 energy companies.

See also
Geothermal Power
Carbon Capture and Storage
Underground Coal Gasification
Coal Bed Methane

References

External links
 CeREES Centre for Geoenergy

Research institutes in the United Kingdom